Oomorphus is a genus of leaf beetles in the family Chrysomelidae. There are about 18 described species in Oomorphus.

Species
These 18 species belong to the genus Oomorphus:

 Oomorphus aenigmatica Lacordaire, 1848
 Oomorphus alvarengai Monros
 Oomorphus amazonicus Monros
 Oomorphus amethystina Perty, 1832
 Oomorphus cavisternum Lacordaire, 1848
 Oomorphus concolor (Sturm, 1807)
 Oomorphus corusca Guérin, 1844
 Oomorphus dorsalis Lacordaire, 1848
 Oomorphus floridanus Horn, 1893
 Oomorphus gibbosa Lacordaire, 1848
 Oomorphus goiasensis Monros
 Oomorphus mexicanus Jacoby, 1890
 Oomorphus minutus Jacoby, 1881
 Oomorphus olivacea Lacordaire, 1848
 Oomorphus puncticeps Lacordaire, 1848
 Oomorphus splendida Lacordaire, 1848
 Oomorphus uva Lacordaire, 1848
 Oomorphus wittmeri Monros

References

Further reading

External links

Chrysomelidae
Articles created by Qbugbot